Leonardo Cavallini (born 4 June 1939) is an Italian bobsledder who competed in the late 1960s. He won a silver medal in the two-man event at the 1966 FIBT World Championships in Cortina d'Ampezzo. Cavallini also finished sixth in the four-man event at the 1968 Winter Olympics in Grenoble.

References
Bobsleigh two-man world championship medalists since 1931
Wallenchinsky, David. (1984). "Bobsled: Four-man". In The Complete Book of the Olympics: 1896-1980. New York: Penguin Books. p. 561.
Leonardo Cavallini's profile at Sports Reference.com

Bobsledders at the 1968 Winter Olympics
Italian male bobsledders
1939 births
Living people
Olympic bobsledders of Italy